The Unnamed Woman is a 1925 American silent drama film directed by Harry O. Hoyt and starring Katherine MacDonald,  Herbert Rawlinson and Wanda Hawley.

Cast
 Katherine MacDonald as Flora Brookes
 Herbert Rawlinson as Donald Brookes
 Wanda Hawley as Doris Gray
 Leah Baird as Billie Norton
 John Miljan as Archie Wesson
 Mike Donlin as Chauffeur

References

Bibliography
 Connelly, Robert B. The Silents: Silent Feature Films, 1910-36, Volume 40, Issue 2. December Press, 1998.
 Munden, Kenneth White. The American Film Institute Catalog of Motion Pictures Produced in the United States, Part 1. University of California Press, 1997.

External links
 

1925 films
1925 drama films
1920s English-language films
American silent feature films
Silent American drama films
Films directed by Harry O. Hoyt
American black-and-white films
Arrow Film Corporation films
1920s American films
English-language drama films